Classe di ferro (Class of Iron) is an Italian action/adventure television series that aired from October 6, 1989, to December 26, 1991. The series focused on a diverse group of young adults who enroll in Italy's military service.

See also
List of Italian television series

References

External links

Italian television series
1989 Italian television series debuts
1991 Italian television series endings